Lynn Loring (born Lynn Zimring; July 14, 1944) is an American actress and television and film producer.

Career
Born Lynn Zimring in Manhattan, Loring began acting with a role on the anthology series Studio One on CBS. In 1951, at the age of seven, she played Patti Barron in the television soap opera Search for Tomorrow. She remained in the role for 10 years, until she graduated from high school in 1961, after which she explored other opportunities, including appearances in films such as Splendor in the Grass (1961) and Pressure Point (1962). She played the title character's daughter in The Jean Carroll Show (1953) on ABC..

In 1963, Loring portrayed Patty Walker, a girl who, due to her wanting to study drama in London, lived with the family of her father's wartime best friend, while the friend's daughter lived with Patty's family in New York, in the comedy series Fair Exchange. Also in 1963, she guest starred as Maybelle in the "Pa Hack's Brood" episode of Gunsmoke. Loring played Susan Foster in the 1964 episode "The Case of the Paper Bullets" on Perry Mason. Also in 1964, she played Filene in the "Memo From Purgatory" episode of The Alfred Hitchcock Hour as well as Bonnie Daniels in the "Behind the Locked Door" episode of the same series. In 1965, she played Maybelle Williams in "Judgement in Heaven", the Christmas episode of the Western series The Big Valley.

Loring played Barbara Erskine, the daughter of Inspector Lewis Erskine (Efrem Zimbalist, Jr.), during the first season (1965-1966) of The F.B.I. In 1966, she played an artist Carma Vasquez in "The Night of the Flaming Ghost" episode of The Wild Wild West and guest-starred as Laurie Ferguson in "Something Hurt, Something Wild", the first episode of the eighth season of Bonanza. In 1967, she guest-starred in two Season 4 episodes of The Man from U.N.C.L.E. ("The Test Tube Killer Affair", "The Deadly Smorgasbord Affair").

Other television work included playing Betty Anderson Harrington in Return to Peyton Place, as well as roles on Wagon Train, The Eleventh Hour, Daniel Boone, Bonanza and The Mod Squad. In 1970, she guest-starred in Season 2, Episode 3, entitled "The Shadow of a Dead Man" on Lancer, having previously guest starred in the Season 1 episode, "Foley".

In 1975, she discontinued acting in favor of a career in production, of both made-for-TV movies and feature films, such as Mr. Mom (1983). In 1979, Loring worked as the casting director for a TV movie, Raid on Coffeyville. She shifted into producing, and for several years had an initially fruitful partnership with Aaron Spelling. In the late 1980s, she was named president of MGM/UA Television Productions. Loring, then only in her 40s, was one of the first women to hold such a high-ranking role in Hollywood.

Personal life
Loring was married to actor Roy Thinnes from 1967 to 1984, when they divorced. They have a son, Christopher Dylan Thinnes, and a daughter, Casey-Leigh Thinnes. In 1967, Loring appeared with Thinnes in the episode "Panic" of The Invaders. Thinnes and Loring played husband and wife in both the 1969 feature film Journey to the Far Side of the Sun (original title: Doppelgänger), and in the 1971 TV movie Black Noon. They also appeared together in the TV horror film The Horror at 37,000 Feet'' (1973).

Loring wed Michael Bergman, an attorney, in 1988.

Filmography

References

External links 

 

1944 births
20th-century American actresses
20th-century American businesspeople
Actresses from New York City
American child actresses
American film actresses
Film producers from New York (state)
American soap opera actresses
American television actresses
Businesspeople from New York City
People from Manhattan
Living people
Television producers from New York City
American women film producers
American women television producers
20th-century American businesswomen
21st-century American women